The 1963 VFL Grand Final was an Australian rules football game contested between the Geelong Football Club and Hawthorn Football Club, held at the Melbourne Cricket Ground in Melbourne on 5 October 1963. It was the 66th annual Grand Final of the Victorian Football League, staged to determine the premiers for the 1963 VFL season. The match, attended by 101,209 spectators, was won by Geelong by a margin of 49 points, marking that club's sixth premiership victory.

Background

Hawthorn were minor premiers as a result of their superior percentage, as both clubs had finished the home and away season with 13 wins and a draw.

Geelong was contesting its eighth VFL Grand final and chasing its sixth premiership, having previously contested in 1953 and last won in 1952. The Hawks were contesting their second VFL Grand final, having beaten  to win their maiden premiership in 1961. For the Cats, this was the third consecutive game they were playing against Hawthorn, having met at Glenferrie Oval in the final round of the home-and-away season, then in the Second Semi-final two weeks later.

After the Cats' important win at Glenferrie, coach Bob Davis, when asked by a reporter what he thought of Hawthorn, called them "the roughest, dirtiest side that [he] had ever seen" and that "Any time they want to play football, we'll give them a hiding". Davis later admitted he didn't care what he said at the time, and Hawthorn coach John Kennedy Sr. took offence at Davis' comments about dirty play, stating that while his team certainly played a vigorous brand of football, he never asked players to deliberately "fix up" opposition players.

Teams

Umpire – Jeff Crouch

Scorecard

References

Bibliography

See also
 1963 VFL season

VFL/AFL Grand Finals
Grand
Geelong Football Club
Hawthorn Football Club